Weh is a Grassfields Bantu language of Cameroon.

References

Ring languages
Languages of Cameroon